Sergei Mikhaylovich Abramov (born 15 September 1959) is a Russian ice hockey player. He competed in the 1994 Winter Olympics.

References

1959 births
Living people
Ice hockey players at the 1994 Winter Olympics
Russian ice hockey goaltenders
Olympic ice hockey players of Russia
Sportspeople from Kazan